Wedding in the Hay (German: Hochzeit im Heu) is a 1951 Austrian-German comedy film directed by Arthur Maria Rabenalt and starring Oskar Sima, Inge Egger and Kurt Seifert. It was shot at the Schönbrunn Studios in Vienna. The film's sets were designed by the art director Felix Smetana.

Cast
 Oskar Sima as Vitus Sentner 
 Inge Egger as Agerl Hauderer 
 Kurt Seifert as Egon Hasse, Fotograf 
 Dagny Servaes as Theres Sentner 
 Lotte Lang as Liesl Furchtsam, Krämerin 
 Helli Servi as Genoveva 
 Joseph Egger as Ferdinand Hauderer 
 Fritz Lehmann as Poldl Sentner 
 Josef Zechell as Weckerl, Bader und Heiratsvermittler 
 Hugo Lindinger as Hölzlbauer 
 Franz Muxeneder
 Franz Burgsteiner
 Josef Enzenberger
 Sepp Stockklauser
 Franz Wimmer
 Josef Fuchs
 Erika Hackinger
 Hans Maiberger
 Marieliese Tamele

See also
Double Suicide (1918)

References

Bibliography 
 Fritsche, Maria. Homemade Men In Postwar Austrian Cinema: Nationhood, Genre and Masculinity . Berghahn Books, 2013.
 Von Dassanowsky, Robert. Austrian Cinema: A History. McFarland, 2005.

External links 
 

1951 films
1951 comedy films
Austrian comedy films
German comedy films
West German films
1950s German-language films
Films directed by Arthur Maria Rabenalt
Films based on works by Ludwig Anzengruber
Remakes of Austrian films
Austrian films based on plays
German films based on plays
Films set in the Alps
Films shot at Schönbrunn Studios
Austrian black-and-white films
German black-and-white films
1950s German films